Delhi Public School, Bokaro Steel City, or DPS Bokaro, was established on 2 July 1987 as an English medium co-educational school affiliated to the Central Board of Secondary Education, New Delhi, India. The school is run by the Delhi Public School Society, New Delhi, an educational society. Dr. M. S. Tyagi was the first principal of the school, followed by Dr. Hemlata S. Mohan. Dr. Awanindra Singh Gangwar is the current principal.

School campus
The school has two campuses in the town. The Junior Wing has students from Pre-Nursery to class 5th and is located in Sector V. The Senior Wing caters to students from classes 6th to 12th and is located in the heart of the city and is spread over a couple of acres in Sector IV.

Facilities

Library
The school has library facilities in both the buildings of the school. The facility is available to students of the school during the school hours. All classes are provided with at least one library period per week. There is ample seating area and the library is an old-school wooden library that has all the selected titles that cater to primary and secondary wing students' interests. All genres are available: comics, drama, fiction, non-fiction, reference books, travel, all major English and vernacular newspapers, national and international magazines pertaining to polity, sports, automobiles and economy.

Auditorium
The junior and senior wing house full-size auditoriums that cater to major arts and culture related events. The senior wing auditorium is housed within the building and the stage is exquisitely designed to host artists and dramatics from around India. The facility is complete with separate rooms for vocal music, instrumental music and dance in the basement of the auditorium. The facility is fully air-conditioned.

Computer centre
There are computer labs in both wings of the school. In the senior school, all the computers are interconnected with LAN and WLAN. Computer education is provided from class I onwards.

High speed (broadband) Internet and email facilities are available in the school. All students(only a select few bright students) of classes VI to XII have access to these facilities. Interactive Smart Board enabled Class from Pre-Nursery to XII.

Laboratories
The school laboratories include Physics lab, Chemistry lab, Biology lab, Language lab, Quiz lab, Mathematics lab, audio – visual hall, Social Sciences lab, Photography lab and Eco Club.

Games and sports
 The campus (Senior Wing in Sector 4) includes a full-sized playground with football field, cricket pitches for net practices, swimming pool, skating rink, volleyball courts, basketball courts, kho-kho and kabaddi courts. 
 The primary wing (Sector 5) also has a full fledged football ground, cricket pitches. Separately, there are sand-pits, swing, slides and see-saws for the primary students.
 Swimming pool can be accessed by students from class 3 onwards.
 There is a gymnasium for training school athletes.
 Table tennis, billiards and carom available in a separate board games' room.
 The school has a big roller skating rink.
 The school has indoor badminton courts.
 Every year the school celebrates its annual sports day. The school invites dignitaries like the Governor of Jharkhand to their sports day meet.
 
Transport
The school has its own buses. All buses run on specified routes and covers the SAIL township area and the neighboring Chas.

Sick rooms
There are sick rooms in both the wings of the school. A trained nurse attends to sick children and provides first aid in case of an emergency. An annual medical checkup of the students is done in the clinic.

The campus neighbors are St. Mary's School, DAV Public School and Laxmi Market.

Deepansh Shiksha Kendra
It was established on 2 July 1998 for providing education to the underprivileged children of nearby slums.

Koshish Vocational Center 
Koshish Vocational Center enables mothers of students of Deepansh to learn skills that will help them earn a livelihood. The school has sewing machines and a professional staff to teach them the skills of designing and tailoring. The women will graduate with a sewing course certificate.

Kurra Village School
Kurra village nestles amongst the sloping meadows 20 km away from Bokaro Steel City. Kurra Village School was adopted by DPS for academic purposes. and then subsequently forgotten after a year. The school did gain some publicity :)

Foreign Language-
The school also provides the education and training in French and German to its students from classes 6 to 8.

Notable alumni 
 Raj Kumar Gupta, Film director of No One Killed Jessica, Aamir and Raid
 Amitabh Thakur, 1992 Batch Indian Police Service (IPS) officer and a social activist

References

Education in India
CBSE

External links
 Official website of DPS Bokaro
 DPS Society
 Official website of DPS Giridih
 Official website of DPS Dhanbad

Schools in Jharkhand
Educational institutions established in 1987
Delhi Public School Society
Education in Bokaro Steel City
1987 establishments in Bihar